Christian Songs is a record chart compiled and published by Billboard that measures the top-performing contemporary Christian music songs in the United States. The data was compiled by Nielsen Broadcast Data Systems based on the weekly audience impressions of each song played on contemporary Christian radio stations until the end of November 2013. With the Billboard issue dated December 7, 2013, the Christian Songs chart began utilizing the same methodology used for the Hot 100 chart to compile its rankings; that is, measuring the airplay of Christian songs across all radio formats, while incorporating data from digital sales and streaming activity. The Christian Airplay listing, which had been published for the first time in 2013, was based solely on Christian radio airplay, a methodology which had previously been used for a decade for Hot Christian Songs.

Details 
In 2010, ten songs by ten artists achieved a No. 1 single, either as a leading artist or featured artist. TobyMac recorded two No. 1s, while Amy Grant achieved one as a featured artist with Matthew West. MercyMe's "All of Creation, Chris Tomlin's "Our God", and Sanctus Real's "Lead Me" tied for the longest-running No. 1 single of 2010, with all three spending a total of nine weeks atop the chart. "All of Creation" was the top ranked song on the year-end chart.

In 2011, seventeen songs by thirteen artists achieved a No. 1 single, either as a leading artist or featured artist. MercyMe, Casting Crowns, and Tenth Avenue North recorded two No. 1s each, while Leigh Nash achieved one as a featured artist with tobyMac. MercyMe and Casting Crowns also tied for the longest-running No. 1 single of 2011, with "Move" and "Glorious Day (Living He Loved Me)" each spending a total of nine weeks atop the chart. Tenth Avenue North's "You Are More" was the top-ranked song on the year-end chart.

In 2012, there were nine No. 1 on the Christian Songs chart by ten artists (Aaron Shust's "My Hope Is in You" first reached the top in 2011 and is not counted in the total). Passion's "One Thing Remains" features Kristian Stanfill. Building 429's "Where I Belong" spent 15 consecutive weeks at No. 1, the longest-running No. 1 single of the year, and was ranked as the top Christian song of 2012. Matt Redman's "10,000 Reasons (Bless the Lord)" had three separate stints at No. 1 for a total of 13 weeks.

In 2013, only four artists topped the Christian Songs chart. Songs by Big Daddy Weave and Passion featuring Kristian Stanfill are not included in the total; "Redeemed" (three weeks in 2013, seven weeks in total) and "One Thing Remains" (three separate stints at No. 1, two weeks in 2013, four weeks in total), respectively, first reached the top in 2012. Chris Tomlin's "Whom Shall I Fear (God of Angel Armies)" was ranked as the top Christian Song of 2013, having earned a cumulative total of 15 weeks on top of the chart. Matthew West's "Hello My Name Is", however, spent more time at No. 1, scoring 17 weeks atop the chart. In September 2013, Hillsong United's "Oceans (Where Feet May Fail)" took over from Mandisa's "Overcomer", starting a record 57-week run at No. 1.

In 2014, only two artists went to No. 1 on the Billboard Christian Songs chart: Hillsong United and Carrie Underwood. Hillsong United's "Oceans (Where Feet May Fail)" continued its run from 2013 and was ranked as the top Christian Song of 2013. In mid-October, Underwood's "Something in the Water" went to No. 1, and maintained its top position until the end of 2014 leading into the first quarter of 2015.

In 2018, only six artists topped the Christian Songs chart. Brooke Simpson's cover of "O Holy Night" spend a week at the top. Hillsong Worship's "What a Beautiful Name" spent its last eight weeks at No. 1. TobyMac's "I Just Need U" debuted at the top of the chart for one week. Cory Asbury's "Reckless Love" spent eighteen weeks on top, being ranked as the top Christian Song of 2018. MercyMe's "I Can Only Imagine" was sent to the top of the chart buoyed by a release of a film inspired by the song. For the rest of the year, Lauren Daigle's "You Say" spent twenty-three consecutive weeks, becoming the fifth longest running song in the chart's history.

Number-one songs

Hot Christian Songs

Christian Airplay

See also
List of number-one Billboard Christian Songs of the 2000s

References

2010s
United States Christian Songs